The men's handball tournament at the 2012 Olympic Games in London was held from 28 July to 12 August at the Olympic Park. The group stage matches were held at the Copper Box and the knockout rounds took place at the larger Basketball Arena.

Twelve nations were represented in the tournament. The four best teams from each group advanced to a quarter-final round, while the 5th and 6th teams in each group were classified 9th–12th by the results of their group matches. Unlike in previous Olympics there was no placement matches involving the losing teams of the quarter-finals.

The medals for the competition were presented by Austin Sealy, Barbados, IOC Member,  Gunilla Lindberg, Sweden, IOC Executive Board Member, and Sheikh Ahmad Al-Fahad Al-Sabah, Kuwait, IOC Member, and the medalists' bouquets were presented by Hassan Moustafa, IHF President, Egypt, Miguel Roca Mas, 1st IHF Vice President, Spain, and Leon Kalin, Slovenia, IHF Commission of Organising and Competitions.

Qualification

Seeding
Before the draw the IHF seeded the teams in six pots. The draw for the groups was held on 30 May 2012.

Rosters

Group stage

Group A

Group B

Knockout stage

Quarter-finals

Semi-finals

Bronze medal match

Gold medal match

Ranking and statistics

Final ranking

Source: IHF.info

All-star team
 Goalkeeper:   Thierry Omeyer
 Left wing:    Jonas Källman
 Left back:    Aron Pálmarsson
 Central back:  Nikola Karabatić
 Right back:   Kim Andersson
 Right wing:   Ivan Čupić
 Pivot:  Julen Aguinagalde
<small>Chosen by team officials and IHF experts: IHF.info

Top goalscorers

Source: IHF.info

Top goalkeepers

Source: IHF.info

Medalists

References

External links 

M
Men's events at the 2012 Summer Olympics